Savannah is a locality in the Shire of Carpentaria, Queensland, Australia.

Geography 
Savannah is part of the Gulf Country. The Norman River flows through the locality from the west (Victoria Vale) to the north-east (Fielding).

Education 
There are no schools in the locality or nearby.

References 

Shire of Carpentaria
Localities in Queensland